The Battle of Surabaya was fought in 1945 as part of the Indonesian National Revolution.

Battle of Surabaya may also refer to:
 Mataram conquest of Surabaya (1614–1625)
 Battle of Surabaya (1677), a battle during the Trunajaya rebellion
 Battle of Surabaya (film), a 2015 Indonesian animated film

See also 
 Surabaya, a city in Indonesia